Atrypa reticularis is an extinct species of brachiopods. The fossils are present from the base of Rhuddanian up to the top of Lower Frasnian.

References 

Prehistoric brachiopods
Spiriferida